Washington is a town in McClain County, Oklahoma, United States. The population was 618 as of the 2010 census.

History
A post office called Washington has been in operation since 1904. The town was not named after George Washington, first President of the United States. The post office charter was granted May 10, 1904. According to the Encyclopedia of Oklahoma History and Culture, the name was actually chosen to honor Caddo chief "Little Boy" George Washington, who had lived nearby.

When the Oklahoma Central Railway was built through McClain County in 1907, local resident Hoyt Turner and his Chickasaw-Choctaw wife, Daisy Willis, petitioned the federal court at Muskogee to remove the restrictions from a surplus allotment east of their farm so that a townsite could be established. The request was approved on December 24, 1907, shortly after statehood became effective, and Washington became the first townsite to have tribal restrictions removed for that reason.

Geography

Washington is located along State Highway 24.

Demographics

As of the census of 2000, there were 520 people, 186 households, and 146 families residing in the town. There were 192 housing units at an average density of 186.0 per square mile (72.0/km2). The racial makeup of the town was 92.12% White, 2.88% Native American, 1.15% Pacific Islander, 1.92% from other races, and 1.92% from two or more races. Hispanic or Latino of any race were 4.23% of the population.

There were 186 households, out of which 42.5% had children under the age of 18 living with them, 65.1% were married couples living together, 9.7% had a female householder with no husband present, and 21.0% were non-families. 18.3% of all households were made up of individuals, and 10.8% had someone living alone who was 65 years of age or older. The average household size was 2.80 and the average family size was 3.18.

31.7% of the population was under the age of 18, 6.7% were 18 to 24, 31.9% were 25 to 44, 17.5% from 45 were 64, and 12.1% were 65 years of age or older. The median age was 32 years. For every 100 females, there were 94.8 males. For every 100 females age 18 and over, there were 91.9 males.

The median income for a household in the town was $31,875, and the median income for a family was $36,806. Males had a median income of $31,429 versus $20,089 for females. The per capita income for the town was $14,309. About 13.1% of families and 17.8% of the population were below the poverty line, including 23.0% of those under age 18 and 18.8% of those age 65 or over.

School system
Washington is the home of Washington Public Schools, which comprises a single K-12 school at 101 E. Kirby, Washington, OK 73093. The mascot is the warrior and school colors are red and white. Their rivals are the Purcell Dragons. , the graduation rate was 94.7%, there were 17.4 students per teacher, and 916 enrolled students.

Sports played by students include: softball, football, basketball, baseball, cheerleading, golf, and track. Extra-curricular activities include academic team, band, FCCLA, FFA, newspaper, NHS, science club, STUCO, and yearbook.

Notable residents
 Lometa Odom (19332017) basketball player and coach, member of the Women's Basketball Hall of Fame
 Nick Blackburn, former pitcher for the Minnesota Twins, became the baseball coach for Washington High School after retiring from professional baseball in 2015.
 James Winchester, long snapper for the Kansas City Chiefs of the National Football League

References

External links

 Washington, OK at City Data

Oklahoma City metropolitan area
Towns in McClain County, Oklahoma
Towns in Oklahoma